The Hall of Shanmen or Shanmen Hall, also known as Hall of Three Liberation or Hall of Mount Gate, is the gate of a Chinese Chan Buddhist temple. In ancient times, nearly all Chinese Buddhist temples had a Shanmen, as an important gate of the temple. After successive wars and cultural discontinuity, with only one gate, most of the existing ancient Buddhist temples usually follow the hall style or change the middle gate of the three main gates into a hall called "Hall of Shanmen".

Architectural Style

Each niche on both sides of Shanmen Hall enshrines a statue of a heavenly deity with a Vajra in his hand, namely Nio, Buddha's warrior attendant, also known as "Yakasha Deity" or "Zhijingang". Vajra originally refers to the short metal weapon of king of all heavenly deities Indra in Indian mythology and symbolizes solidness and sharpness in Buddhism. Nio is a Dharmapala who protects Buddhism with his Vajra in his hand.

Originally, there is only one Nio. However, in order to meet Chinese custom of being in pairs, Chinese people cast two Nio to safeguard the mount gate after the introduction of Buddhism from India to China in the Eastern Han Dynasty (25-220). The Nio are wearing crowns, ethereal clothes with their upper bodies exposed, with well-developed muscles and short skirts. The Nio have widely open eyes and protruding noses, holding weapons in their hands, and glaring the ground awesomely and angrily. The Nio, the right one, has its mouth open to pronounce the sound "a", while the other has it closed to utter the sound "hong". The symbolism is the same already seen. The generic name for statues with an open mouth is General Ha, that for those with a closed mouth General Heng. "A" and "Hong", are the start and end sounds in Sanskrit, symbolizing the basis of sounds and bearing the profound theory of Dharma.

References

Further reading

External links

Buddhist architecture
Buddhism in China